9th ZAI Awards
Artmedia Music Academy Awards
Presenter(s)  

Broadcaster STV

Grand Prix Kamil Peteraj

◄ 8th │ 10th ►

The 9th ZAI Awards, honoring the best in the Slovak music industry for individual achievements for the year of 1998, took time and place on February 26, 1999, at the New Scene Theater in Bratislava. The ceremony was held in association with the local Music Fund (HF) and, for the first time, with the International Federation of the Phonographic Industry Slovakia (SNS IFPPI). For that reason, the accolades were renamed after the Artmedia Music Academy, established by ZAI and the related company. The winners received a plaque with a five-pointed golden star. Host of the event was Peter Kočiš.

Winners

Main categories

{| class=wikitable
! style=background:#FFC40C width=273| Vocal Artist
! style=background:#FFC40C width=273| Vocal Ensemble
|-
| scope=row valign=top|
★ Richard Müller
| scope=row valign=top|
★ IMT Smile
|-
! style=background:#FFC40C width=273| Instrumental Artist
! style=background:#FFC40C width=273| New Artist
|-
| scope=row valign=top|
★ Andrej Šeban 
| scope=row valign=top|
★ Free Faces
|-
! style=background:#FFC40C width=273| Cover Art
! style=background:#FFC40C width=273| Song
|-
| scope=row valign=top|
★ Jozef Červeň – Almost True Story 
| scope=row valign=top|
★ "Nočná optika"  – Richard Müller 
|-
! style=background:#FFC40C width=273| Record
! style=background:#FFC40C width=273| Album
|-
| scope=row valign=top|
★ Almost True Story  – Ivan Jombík
| scope=row valign=top|
★ Nočná optika – Richard Müller
|-
! style=background:#FFC40C width=273| Producer
! style=background:#FFC40C width=273| Music Video
|-
| scope=row valign=top| 
★  Richard Müller – Nočná optika 
 Tomáš Dohňanský with Ivan Minárik – Chupacabras  
| scope=row valign=top| 
★ "Môžeš závidieť"  – Karol Vosátko'|}

Other nominees included also Street Dancers, Peter Lipa, Adriena Bartošová and No Name.

Others

References
 
 
 

External links
 ZAI Awards > Winners (Official site)
 Artmedia Awards > 1998 Winners (at SME'')

09
Zai Awards
1998 music awards